Vermilionville Historic Village, located in Lafayette, Louisiana, is a Cajun and Creole living history museum with restored historic structures.

Structures and exhibits
Buildings in the village include:
La Chapelle des Attakapas - a reproduction of the style based on the Catholic churches at Pointe Coupée (1760) and St. Martinville (1773)
Beau Bassin - Circa 1840, Creole and American Greek Revival style
Maison Boucvalt - Circa 1860, a classic 19th century Acadian/Creole house
Maison Mouton - a reconstruction of an 1810 house, a basic Acadian house with a detached kitchen
L’École - a reproduction typical of 1890s schoolhouse architecture
Maison des Cultures - Circa 1840, Acadian style
Trapper's Cabin
Maison Acadienne - Circa 1830
Maison Buller - 1803, Creole style
Maison Broussard - 1790, French Creole style

See also
 Acadian Village (park), also in Lafayette

Gallery

References

Further reading

External links
Vermilionville official website

Culture of Lafayette, Louisiana
Museums in Lafayette Parish, Louisiana
Buildings and structures in Lafayette, Louisiana
Lafayette, Louisiana
Open-air museums in Louisiana